"All Hung Up in Your Green Eyes" is a popular song composed and performed by Sandy Posey. In 1968, it was released as the reverse side of MGM 45 rpm record "Your Conception of Love". In the same year it was covered by Şehrazat in Turkish ("İki Gölge").

References

 

1968 singles
1968 songs
MGM Records singles
Sandy Posey songs